Yerra Seshagiri Rao, popularly known as Giri Babu, is an Indian actor, producer, and director who primarily woks in Telugu films. His son, Raghu Babu, is a notable actor-director.

Career

Giri Babu hails from a middle class agricultural family in Ravinuthala village Prakasam district. He moved to Madras to pursue a career in films. Babu started his career as a lead actor but later portrayed antagonistic and comedic roles.

Filmography

Director

Producer

Actor

Jagame Maya (1973)ChandeeDorababu as ShankarJyothi (1976) as ShankaraMaa Daivam (1976)Vadhu Varulu (1976)Swami Drohulu (1976)Kurukshetram (1977) as DushasanaPremalekhalu (1977)Indra Dhanussu (1977)Devathalara Deevinchandi (1977)Kalpana (1977) as SeshuDongala Dopidi (1978)Simha garjana (1978)Dudu Basavanna (1978) as KotaiahKumara Raja (1978)Karunamayudu (1978) as Saint JohnShri Rama Raksha (1978)Athani Kante Ghanudu (1978)Naa Illu Naa Vaalu (1979)Swami Drohulu (1979)Karm Veer (1980)Kiladi Krishnudu (1980) as KishoreAdrushtavanthudu (1980)Erra Mallelu (1981)Ooriki Ichina Maata (1981)Sawaal (1982)Nivuru Gappina Nippu (1982)Naa Desam (1982) as KumarBangaru Bhoomi (1982)Gruha Pravesam (1982)Kalavari Samsaram (1982) as RaghuShakti (1983) as GiriMundadugu (1983)Dharma Poratam (1983) as BhaskarAdavi Simhalu (1983)Mugguru Monagallu (1983)Rustum (1984)Merupu Daadi (1984) as GandaduSrimathi Kaavali (1984)Mahanagaramlo Mayagadu (1984)Inti Guttu (1984)Muchataga Mugguru (1985)Surya Chandra (1985)Maha Manishi (1985)Jackie (1985)Ranarangam (1985)Edadugula Bandham (1985)Vijetha (1985) as Narasimham's third sonSimhasanam (1986) as Ugra Rahu Army chief of AvanthiUgra Narasimham (1986) as GiriJayam Manade (1986)Khaidi Rudraiah (1986) as Venkatagiri "Giri"Dongodochadu (1987)Pasivadi Pranam (1987)Thene Manasulu (1987)Muddayi (1987)Sankharam (1987) as UdayDonga Garu Swagatham (1987)Chuttalabbayi (1988)Mugguru Kodukulu (1988) as Ranga RaoChikkadu Dorakadu (1988) as Chinnodu SivamGoonda Rajyam (1989)Gudachari 117 (1989) as GookarnamSahasame Naa Oopiri (1989)Ajatha Satruvu (1989)Bala Gopaludu (1989)Ajatha Satruvu (1989) as SivaramKoduku Diddina Kapuram (1989) as KondaiahAthaku Yamudu Ammayiki Mogudu (1989)Anna Thammudu (1990) as SeshagiriPrema Yuddham (1990)Nirnayam (1991) as Police CommissionerNaa Pellam Naa Ishtam (1991)Mondi Mogudu Penki Pellam (1991)Alludu Diddina Kapuram (1991)Killer (1992) as Malavika's husbandGangwar (1992)Pachani Samsaram (1992)Golmaal Govindam (1992)Chitram Bhalare Vichitram (1992)420 (1992)Chillari Mogudu Allari Koduku (1992)Parugo Parugu (1993) as VeeruHello Brother (1994) as Manga's fatherGandeevam (1994)Prema & Co. (1994)Brahmachari Mogudu (1994) as Kutumba RaoBhairava Dweepam (1994) as UttarBangaru Kutumbam (1994) as Pushpa's brother-in-lawAlibaba Aradajanu Dongalu (1994)Hello Alludu (1994)Vajram (1995) as Chakri's uncleGhatotkachudu (1995) as Dharma RajuAlluda Majaka (1995) as Lawyer SivaramakrishnaSisindri (1995)Ninne Pelladata (1996) as HariLittle Soldiers (1996) as SeshagiriUgadi (1997)Pelli (1997)Aavida Maa Aavide (1998) as Vikranth's fatherChandralekha (1998) as DoctorPrema Katha (1999) as Janaki RamaiahSwayamvaram (1999)Alludugaaru Vachcharu (1999) as Shankar RaoRavoyi Chandamama (1999) as Sujeeth's fatherNuvve Kavali (2000) as Tarun's fatherBagunnaraa (2000)Adavi Chukka (2000) as SimhachalamApparao Ki Oka Nela Thappindi (2001) as Mohan RaoFamily Circus (2001) as Krishna RaoSimharasi (2001) Raa (2001)Akasa Veedhilo (2001) as Jagadiswara RaoSnehamante Idera (2001) as Aravind's uncleOkato Number Kurradu (2002)Idiot (2002) as InspectorHoli (2002)Nee Sneham (2002) as Madhav's fatherParasuram (2002)Vijayam (2003) as Usha's fatherVishnu (2003)Golmaal (2003)Fools (2003) as Adabala Raja RaoNinne Ishtapaddanu (2003) as Charan's fatherSambaram (2003) as Geeta's fatherSeenu Vasanthi Lakshmi (2004)Kushikushigaa (2004)Cheppave Chirugali (2004)Mr & Mrs Sailaja Krishnamurthy (2004) as Krishnamurthy's bossSuryam (2004)Vidyardhi (2004)Athadu (2005) as Poori's fatherNayakudu (2005)Kithakithalu (2006) as Rajababu's fatherGame (2006) as Rama Chandra MurthyPellaina Kothalo (2006)Allare Allari (2006)Evadaithe Nakenti (2007) as Chief MinisterMadhumasam (2007)Okkadunnadu (2007) as Gautami's fatherClassmates (2007)Viyyalavari Kayyalu (2007)Krishna (2008)Okka Magaadu (2008)Gamyam (2008)Mesthri (2009)Evaraina Epudaina (2009) as Madhumita's fatherSaleem (2009) as Singamanaidu's friendBetting Bangaraju (2010)Subhapradam (2010)Raaj (2011)Gaddam Gang (2015) as PoliticianDongaata (2015) as Elderly Man in Senior Living HomeA Aa (2016) as Mr. BanerjeeRaa Raa (2018)Pantham (2018) as High Court JudgeSrinivasa Kalyanam (2018) as Vasu's relativeGeetha Govindam (2018) as Geetha's grandfatherJathi Ratnalu (2021) as Chief MinisterSreekaram (2021) as AnantharajuMost Eligible Bachelor'' (2021) as Judge

References

External links
 
 
Giri Babu Filmography
Article About Giri Babu 
Giri Babu Open Heart with RK 

Living people
Male actors from Andhra Pradesh
Male actors in Telugu cinema
Indian male film actors
Telugu comedians
1946 births
People from Prakasam district
20th-century Indian male actors
21st-century Indian male actors
21st-century Indian film directors
Telugu film directors
Telugu film producers
Film directors from Andhra Pradesh
Film producers from Andhra Pradesh